Kima atra is a jumping spider species in the genus Kima that lives in Tanzania. It was first described in 2000, found in a wasp's nest.

References

Endemic fauna of Tanzania
Fauna of Tanzania
Salticidae
Spiders described in 2000
Spiders of Africa
Taxa named by Wanda Wesołowska